Alik Gunashian or Gyunashyan (born 1955, Leninakan, Armenia) is an Armenian popular singer.

He started his career in the local clubs and restaurants of Leninakan as an amateur singer. His bootlegs and unofficial MC-recordings made his name popular since the Soviet times. Among his most famous songs were "Leninakan", "Dzerutyun", "Yerkrasharzh", "Dadarel en jragners", "Dajan kyank e", and "Mi dzaghik er". After the 1988 Spitak earthquake, he moved to Los Angeles, where he formed a folk band and recorded a number of CD's.

Discography
 "Tarinerov sharunak" (1997)
 "Chi hognel Haye" (1997)
 "Antsan orere" (1998)
 "Mi aragil" (1998)
 "Im Nona" (2000)
 "De ari yar" (2001)
 "Gusanakan husher" (2005)
 «50» (2005)
 «2007» (2007)

External links
 Armenian Sound Network - Alik Gunashian: 50
 Gunashian at Akhtamar Rec. catalog
 Alik Gunashian

Living people
1955 births
People from Gyumri
20th-century Armenian male singers
Armenian pop singers